Moss is an unincorporated community in Clay County, Tennessee, United States.

Geography
The highway's junction with Tennessee State Route 51, which connects the area to Tompkinsville, Kentucky, lies just west of the community.

Post office
Moss has a post office with ZIP code 38575.

References

Unincorporated communities in Clay County, Tennessee
Unincorporated communities in Tennessee